Amistad ("friendship" in Spanish) may refer to:

Places
Amistad, New Mexico, US
Amistad, Texas, US
Amistad National Recreation Area, including the Amistad Reservoir, Texas
Amistad Reservoir, a reservoir on the Rio Grande near Del Rio, Texas
La Amistad International Park, a large International Park in Panama and Costa Rica

Arts, media, and entertainment
Amistad (publishing), an imprint of HarperCollins Publishing
"Amistad", a working title for the song "You Found Me" by The Fray
Amistad Memorial (New Haven), the memorial in New Haven, Connecticut recognizing the mutiny aboard La Amistad
Mutiny on the Amistad: The Saga of a Slave Revolt and Its Impact on American Abolition, Law, and Diplomacy (1987), the historical account of the La Amistad mutiny by Howard Jones
Amistad (film), a 1997 Steven Spielberg movie based on the events of the book

Law
United States v. The Amistad (1841), United States Supreme Court case deciding the fate of the captives who mutinied on the ship Amistad

Ships
Amistad/Amitie, an 18th-century schooner that transported Acadians from France to Louisiana
La Amistad, a 19th-century Spanish schooner on which captured Africans meant for the slave trade rebelled in 1839 and took control; the case reached the US Supreme Court and was notable in the abolition movement
Freedom Schooner Amistad, a 1998 recreation of the original La Amistad schooner

Other uses 
Amistad gambusia, an extinct fish that lived in springs now flooded by Amistad Reservoir in Texas
Amistad Research Center, a research center at Tulane University, New Orleans, Louisiana devoted to research about slavery, civil rights, and African Americans that commemorates the revolt of slaves on the ship by the same name
 Amistad, a popular Award of Garden Merit cultivar of Salvia